The Montenegrin cap is a cap traditionally worn in Montenegro by the Montenegrins and Serbs of Montenegro. It was introduced by Prince Bishop Petar II Petrović-Njegoš in the mid-1840s as a replacement for the then-popular fez.

Design and symbolism

The cap is originally in the shape of a flat cylinder, having a red upper surface (called tepelak) not dissimilar to the Herzegovina and Lika caps. Prince-Bishop Petar II Petrović-Njegoš wore it with a black rim (called derevija), and the definition given was as a sign of grief of occupied Kosovo. The Kosovo Myth was very popular in Montenegro. The enforcement of the cap upon the Montenegrin chieftains by Prince-Bishop Petar II was a mark of expression of then's dominating Serbian national identity.

The national telling recorded the most often version of the cap as following: the black wrapper was a sign of grief for their once great Serbian Empire, the red the symbol of spilled blood at the Battle of Kosovo and the five small stripes on the top represent the remaining remains of the once great Serbian realm, which became increasingly popular amongst the common folk during the reign of Prince Danilo I Petrović-Njegoš. Within the stripes is angled a six star, representing the last free part, Montenegro, shining upon the fallen and conquered.

During the Communist era in the second half of the 20th century instead of the Serb cross the Communist Red Star was implanted between the golden stripes, although it was not spread amongst the people and never accepted. Several years ago a new version appeared with a large modern (2004) Coat of Arms of Montenegro spread across the cap's red top, that is becoming increasingly popular as a sign of the Montenegrin nation's independence and sovereignty. A female version of the cap was introduced, so far worn almost exclusively by men.

History
Montenegrin cap has a history of three hundred years. Artwork from 1754 with portrait of Montenegrin from Paštrovići is the oldest presentation of Montenegrin cap, only difference is that Paštrovići cap is all in black color. It is assumed that the cap from Paštrovići ie Montenegrin cap has pattern in Venetian cap. The first presentation of the cap in two-color variant (black and red) is find on aquarelle from 1782. Josef Holeček on his journey through Montenegro in 1876 described the cap  and recorded that Montenegrin cap has motif of Montenegrin eagle.

Gallery

See also
 Culture of Montenegro

References

Cap
Caps
Montenegro–Serbia relations
Montenegrin nationalism
Serbian nationalism
National symbols of Montenegro
History of the Serbs of Montenegro
History of Montenegro